Hannig is a German surname. Notable people with the surname include:

Betsy Hannig (born 1963), American politician
Gary Hannig (born 1952), American politician
Horst Hannig (1921–1943), German World War II flying ace
Nick Hannig (born 1986), German boxer

German-language surnames
Surnames from given names